Karga may refer to:
 a ship in Wing Commander: False Colors
 Karga (island), in Greece
 Karga, Iran, a village in East Azerbaijan Province, Iran
 Karga, Çerkeş
 Karga, Arab.  jizya tax